The 1962–63 Cincinnati Royals season was the team's 15th season in the National Basketball Association (NBA) and its sixth in Cincinnati. The Royals were shifted from the Western Division into the Eastern Division before the start of the season because the Philadelphia Warriors had relocated to San Francisco. In their first season in the Eastern Division, the Royals posted a 42–38 record and finished in 3rd place.
The season saw the Royals challenged by a rival league, the American Basketball League run by Abe Saperstein, like few NBA teams ever have been. Larry Staverman and Win Wilfong had left the team for the new league. #1 draft picks Larry Siegfried and Jerry Lucas were both also signed away by the ABL. These key losses would later greatly affect the team's playoffs result. Lucas was particularly missed by Cincinnati fans.
Oscar Robertson nonetheless led a balanced and solid Royals five that year, supported by Wayne Embry, Jack Twyman, Bob Boozer and Arlen Bockhorn. Draft pick Adrian Smith had arrived and joined Tom Hawkins and Hub Reed at the head of the bench. Robertson posted 28.3 points per game, and his league-leading assists total was twice that of all but one other NBA player. He sank the second-most free throws in the league, and was a strong third on the Royals in rebounds.

The Royals were consistent winners all season long, buoyed by a 10–6 November.

In the playoffs, the Royals would win their first playoff series in 11 years. The Royals upset the second-place Syracuse Nationals with an overtime win on the road in Game 5 on March 26. The two teams had each won their two home games before Robertson led the upset. It was the last NBA game ever hosted by a team in Syracuse, New York. In the Eastern Finals, the Royals faced the defending NBA Champion Boston Celtics and stunned them with two wins at Boston Gardens to seize a 2–1 series lead. Thomas E. Wood, the team's key owner, died in 1961. An ownership dispute between competing groups came to a head in 1963 when Louis Jacobs, who had bought Cincinnati Gardens from the Wood estate, scheduled a circus for the week of the Boston series without telling the Royals. The team was furious and had to host their second home playoff game at Xavier University's small Schmidt Fieldhouse. Despite that fact, and the earlier loss of draft pick Jerry Lucas, Robertson led the team to a third win over the Celtics in Game Six to force a seventh game.
The Royals lost Game Seven in Boston on April 10, 142–131. Robertson had 43 points, the Celtics' Sam Jones had 47 in that concluding game. The season marks arguably the closest the Cincinnati Royals ever came to an NBA title, despite the obstacles mentioned above.

Ballyhooed #1 pick Jerry Lucas, two-time NCAA Player of The Year, was signed away by George Steinbrenner of the ABL Cleveland Pipers, a serious blow to this year's team.
 2 pick was 6' 8 Bud Olsen of Louisville, a college star with local ties.

Roster

<noinclude>

Regular season

Season standings

Record vs. opponents

Season schedule

The Royals won five straight to move to 10–6 in November, and followed that with a 6–8 December. They were 9–9 in both January and February, reaching 36–31 on 2-21-63. The Royals won four straight to finish the season 42-38.

Playoffs

|- align="center" bgcolor="#ffcccc"
| 1
| March 19
| @ Syracuse
| L 120–123
| Oscar Robertson (29)
| Onondaga War Memorial4,335
| 0–1
|- align="center" bgcolor="#ccffcc"
| 2
| March 21
| Syracuse
| W 133–115
| Oscar Robertson (41)
| Cincinnati Gardens3,205
| 1–1
|- align="center" bgcolor="#ffcccc"
| 3
| March 23
| @ Syracuse
| L 117–121
| Embry, Twyman (24)
| Onondaga War Memorial8,007
| 1–2
|- align="center" bgcolor="#ccffcc"
| 4
| March 24
| Syracuse
| W 125–118
| Oscar Robertson (29)
| Cincinnati Gardens3,331
| 2–2
|- align="center" bgcolor="#ccffcc"
| 5
| March 26
| @ Syracuse
| W 131–127 (OT)
| Oscar Robertson (32)
| Onondaga War Memorial7,418
| 3–2
|-

|- align="center" bgcolor="#ccffcc"
| 1
| March 28
| @ Boston
| W 135–132
| Oscar Robertson (43)
| Oscar Robertson (14)
| Oscar Robertson (10)
| Boston Garden13,798
| 0–1
|- align="center" bgcolor="#ffcccc"
| 2
| March 29
| Boston
| L 102–125
| Oscar Robertson (28)
| Wayne Embry (16)
| —
| Cincinnati Gardens11,102
| 1–1
|- align="center" bgcolor="#ccffcc"
| 3
| March 31
| @ Boston
| W 121–116
| Oscar Robertson (23)
| Bob Boozer (14)
| Oscar Robertson (8)
| Boston Garden13,909
| 2–1
|- align="center" bgcolor="#ffcccc"
| 4
| April 3
| Boston
| L 110–128
| Oscar Robertson (25)
| Robertson, Embry (15)
| —
| Cincinnati Gardens3,498
| 2–2
|- align="center" bgcolor="#ffcccc"
| 5
| April 6
| @ Boston
| L 120–125
| Oscar Robertson (36)
| Wayne Embry (14)
| Oscar Robertson (10)
| Boston Garden13,909
| 2–3
|- align="center" bgcolor="#ccffcc"
| 6
| April 7
| Boston
| W 109–99
| Oscar Robertson (36)
| Wayne Embry (22)
| —
| Cincinnati Gardens7,745
| 3–3
|- align="center" bgcolor="#ffcccc"
| 7
| April 10
| @ Boston
| L 131–142
| Oscar Robertson (43)
| Embry, Hawkins (7)
| Oscar Robertson (6)
| Boston Garden13,909
| 3–4
|-

Player statistics

Season

Playoffs

Awards and honors
 Oscar Robertson, First Team All-NBA selection, NBA All-Star
 Wayne Embry, NBA All-Star
 Jack Twyman, NBA All-Star

References

 Royals on Basketball Reference

Sacramento Kings seasons
Cincinnati
Cincinnati
Cincinnati